Villupuram is a state legislative assembly constituency in Viluppuram district in the Indian state of Tamil Nadu. Its State Assembly Constituency number is 74. It comprises a portion of Viluppuram taluk and is a part of the Viluppuram constituency for national elections to the Parliament of India. It is one of the 234 State Legislative Assembly Constituencies in Tamil Nadu.

Villupuram was one of 17 assembly constituencies to have Voter-verified paper audit trail (VVPAT) facilities with EVMs in the state elections of 2016.

Most successful party: DMK (9 times)

Madras State

Tamil Nadu

Election results

2021

2016

2011

2006

2001

1996

1991

1989

1984

1980

1977

1971

1967

1962

1957

1952

References 

 

Assembly constituencies of Tamil Nadu
Viluppuram district